Baillieu Peak is a peak,  high, that rises above the ice sheet  south of Cape Bruce and  west-southwest of Pearce Peak. It was discovered in February 1931 by the British Australian New Zealand Antarctic Research Expedition  under Mawson, and named for Clive Latham Baillieu (later Baron Baillieu), a patron of the expedition.

References 

Mountains of Mac. Robertson Land